Yelena Nikolayevna Tyushnyakova  (born 4 January 1963) is a Soviet-born Russian retired speed skater and ice hockey player. She competed in two speed skating events at the 1992 Winter Olympics as a member of the Unified Team.

Tyushkanova also played ice hockey as a defenceman at the Russian national level. She served as the inaugural captain of the Russian Women's Hockey League (RWHL) team Metelitsa Chelyabinsk during the 1997–98 season. As of the 2021–22 season, she serves as the conditioning coach of the Belye Medveditsy Chelyabinsk (previously Metelitsa Chelyabinsk) in the Zhenskaya Hockey League (ZhHL; replaced RWHL in 2015).

References

External links
 

1963 births
Living people
Belye Medveditsy players
Russian female speed skaters
Russian women's ice hockey defencemen
Olympic speed skaters of the Unified Team
Speed skaters at the 1992 Winter Olympics
Sportspeople from Chelyabinsk